Noel Felix (born October 4, 1981) is a former Belizean-American professional basketball player born in Los Angeles, California.

A 6'9", 225 lb. forward-center from Fresno State, Felix was the Continental Basketball Association (CBA) Defensive Player of the Year and earned All-CBA First Team honors in the 2005–06 season, playing for the Sioux Falls Skyforce.

Felix signed a 10-day contract with the Sonics as an undrafted free agent on March 2, 2006. At the end of that month, he was signed for the remainder of the season, appearing in a total of 12 games and averaging 1.5 ppg. 
In October 2006, Felix was waived by the Sonics. Later that month he signed a two-year contract with Israel's Maccabi Tel Aviv.

Felix started the 2007–08 season playing in the NBA Development League playing for the Anaheim Arsenal but in December 2007 signed with Hapoel Jerusalem.

In 2010, Felix spent time with the Springfield Armor and Maine Red Claws of the NBA Development League.

In 2011, Felix joined the Dacin Tigers of the Super Basketball League.

References

External links
Eurobasket.com profile

1981 births
Living people
American expatriate basketball people in Taiwan
American men's basketball players
American people of Belizean descent
Anaheim Arsenal players
Basketball players from Los Angeles
Belizean men's basketball players
Caciques de Humacao players
Fresno State Bulldogs men's basketball players
Guaiqueríes de Margarita players
Hapoel Jerusalem B.C. players
Idaho Stampede (CBA) players
Israeli Basketball Premier League players
Maccabi Tel Aviv B.C. players
Maine Red Claws players
People with acquired Belizean citizenship
Power forwards (basketball)
Seattle SuperSonics players
Sioux Falls Skyforce (CBA) players
Springfield Armor players
Undrafted National Basketball Association players
Yakima Sun Kings players
Inglewood High School (California) alumni
United States men's national basketball team players
Dacin Tigers players
Super Basketball League imports